The first full-scale Ottoman siege of Constantinople took place in 1422 as a result of the Byzantine Emperor Manuel II's attempts to interfere in the succession of Ottoman Sultans, after the death of Mehmed I in 1421. This policy of the Byzantines was often used successfully in weakening their neighbours.

When Murad II emerged as the winning successor to his father, he marched into Byzantine territory. The Turks had acquired their own cannon for the first time by the siege of 1422, "falcons", which were short but wide cannons. The two sides were evenly matched technologically, and the Turks had to build barricades "in order to receive ... the stones of the bombards".

Siege
The eyewitness John Kananos describes how the vanguard under Mihaloğlu ravaged the city's suburbs, before Murad himself arrived on 20 June with the main army and the siege engines, and the siege began in earnest.

Murad was forced to lift the siege due to the rebellion of his younger brother, Küçük Mustafa, in Anatolia. This was supported with men by the Anatolian beyliks of Germiyan and Karaman, who feared a revival of Ottoman power, as well as, according to Doukas, money given by the Byzantine emperor. Mustafa was thus able to gather a significant army, and in late August or early September laid siege to the Ottoman capital, Bursa. Contemporary Byzantine tradition ascribed the deliverance of Constantinople to a miraculous intervention by the Theotokos.

Aftermath 

In spite of the Byzantine victory, the 'Empire' at this time had in fact been reduced to a few disconnected strips of land besides the city of Constantinople itself. It was also facing grave economic problems and severely lacked soldiers. Pius II promoted the affordable donation of cannon by European monarchs as a means of aid. Any new cannons after the 1422 siege were gifts from European states, and aside from these no other advances were made to the Byzantine arsenal. As such, the next Ottoman leader, Mehmed II, would be successful in 1453.

Traditions 

Byzantine accounts attributed the lifting of the siege to an apparition of the Theotokos upon the city walls, which greatly inspired the defenders. John Kananos records that:

Also in the same reference, the Ottoman Army notes that they themselves even saw a woman in purple robes walking on the outer ramparts of the city.

References

Sources
 

1420s in the Byzantine Empire
1422 in Europe
1422 in the Ottoman Empire
Conflicts in 1422
15th century in Istanbul
Constantinople 1422
Constantinople 1422
Constantinople 1422
1422